The avian family Icteridae are variously called icterids, troupials and allies, or oropendolas, orioles, blackbirds by taxonomic authorities. The family comprise the New World blackbirds, New World orioles, grackles, cowbirds, oropendolas, and several smaller groups. The International Ornithological Committee (IOC) recognizes these 110 species distributed among 30 genera, 14 of which have only one species. One extinct species, the slender-billed grackle, is included.

This list is presented according to the IOC taxonomic sequence and can also be sorted alphabetically by common name and binomial.

References

I